Donn Shléibhe Mac Cerbaill, Irish musician, died 1357. 

The Annals of Connacht sub anno 1357 mention the death of Donn Shléibhe Mac Cerbaill, an accomplished musician.

Mac Cerbaill or Mac Cearbhaill, anglicised as MacCarroll and MacCarvill, was the name of two unrelated clans, one located in south Leinster in the region of County Carlow and County Kilkenny; a second family of the name, noted for its musicians, was located in County Antrim. 

It is a distinct surname from Ó Cearbhaill.

References
 "Music and Musicians in Medieval Irish Society", Ann Buckley, pp. 165–190, Early Music xxviii, no. 2, May 2000
 "Music in Prehistoric and Medieval Ireland", Ann Buckley, pp. 744–813, in A New History of Ireland, volume one, Oxford, 2005.

External links
List of Published Texts at CELT
Irish names

Medieval Gaels from Ireland
Musicians from Northern Ireland
14th-century Irish musicians
People from County Antrim